Fake product may refer to:

 Counterfeit consumer goods, products infringing the rights of a trade mark.
 False documents describing a non-existing product with verisimilitude.